The 2019–20 Welsh Premier League was the eleventh season of the Women's Welsh Premier League, the top level women's football league in Wales. The season began on 8 September 2019 and was suspended indefinitely in March due to the COVID-19 pandemic.

In May, it was confirmed that the season would be deemed complete and an unweighted points per game method would be used to determine the league winner. After an unbeaten season, Swansea City were crowned champions for the fourth time in their history, winning 10 and drawing 1 of their 11 games. Swansea City also reached the final of the WPWL Cup, but their game against Cardiff Met. to decide the winner of the competition did not take place after the FAW National Cup Board terminated the competition.

Alana Murphy of Cardiff City won the Golden Boot after scoring 10 goals in 10 games. Swansea City goalkeeper Deanna Lewis won the Golden Glove after only conceding one goal during the season.

Clubs

After finishing at the bottom of the table in the 2018–19 season, Rhyl Ladies ended up remaining in the top division after no teams applied for promotion from the North Wales Women's League. However, in August it was announced that Rhyl Ladies would be withdrawing their place in the competition, citing a lack of players. The league began with nine times, but in December Llandudno Ladies also withdrew from the league with immediate effect and their results up until that point were expunged. The league finished with eight competing teams.

Standings

Awards

Annual awards

League Cup
This was the seventh season of the WPWL Cup. The competition was revamped to include a group stage with each team playing two home games and two away games, with the top two teams progressing to the semi-final. Swansea City topped Group 1, with Cardiff City finishing runners up. Cardiff Met. topped Group 2, with Port Talbot Town finishing runners up. In the semi-finals, Cardiff Met. beat Cardiff City on penalties following a 2–2 draw and would have gone on to play Swansea City in the final after their 3–0 victory over Port Talbot Town. The final did not end up taking place and as such there was no winner of the competition.

References 

Welsh Premier Women's Football League seasons
Welsh Premier League, 2019-20 Women